John Power (23 March 1932 – 6 April 2005) was an Australian cricketer. He played 26 first-class cricket matches for Victoria between 1953 and 1960.

See also
 List of Victoria first-class cricketers

References

External links
 

1932 births
2005 deaths
Australian cricketers
Victoria cricketers
Cricketers from Melbourne